Hrobice is the name of several locations in the Czech Republic:

 Hrobice, a village in Pardubice Region (Pardubice District)
 Hrobice, a village in Zlín Region (Zlín District)